Intadjedite is a rural commune in the Tin-Essako Cercle in Mali's north-eastern Kidal Region. The commune of Intadjedite as well as the neighbouring commune of Alata were created by law 001–041 dated 7 June 2005.

References

Communes of Kidal Region
Tuareg